Muhammad Mifathul Ikhsan (born on 18 February 2000) is an Indonesian professional footballer who plays as a right back for Liga 2 club Persijap Jepara, on loan from Liga 1 club Borneo.

Club career

Borneo
In 2019, Ikhsan signed with Indonesian Liga 1 club Borneo. He made his first-team debut on 20 November 2019 in a match against PSS Sleman at the Maguwoharjo Stadium, Sleman.

Arema (loan)
He was signed for Arema to play in the Liga 1 in the 2020 season, on loan from Borneo. This season was suspended on 27 March 2020 due to the COVID-19 pandemic. The season was abandoned and was declared void on 20 January 2021.

Rans Cilegon (loan) 
In 2021, Ikhsan signed with Indonesian Liga 2 club Rans Cilegon, on loan from Borneo.

Career statistics

Club

Notes

References

External links
 Mifathul Ikhsan at Soccerway

2000 births
Living people
People from Penajam North Paser Regency
Sportspeople from East Kalimantan
Indonesian footballers
Liga 1 (Indonesia) players
Liga 2 (Indonesia) players
Borneo F.C. players
Arema F.C. players
RANS Nusantara F.C. players
Persijap Jepara players
Association football fullbacks